Vincent Lynch (born 21 September 1968) is a Barbadian former cyclist. He competed in the sprint event at the 1988 Summer Olympics.

References

1968 births
Living people
Barbadian male cyclists
Olympic cyclists of Barbados
Cyclists at the 1988 Summer Olympics
Place of birth missing (living people)